Diodora fuscocrenulata is a species of sea snail, a marine gastropod mollusk in the family Fissurellidae, the keyhole limpets and slit limpets.

Description
The size of the shell varies between 8 mm and 20 mm.

Distribution
This species occurs in the Indian Ocean off KwaZuluNatal, South Africa.

References

External links
 To World Register of Marine Species
 

Fissurellidae
Gastropods described in 1906